Celebrity Close Calls is a television series on BIO and Reelz Channel, a reality show that interviews various celebrities who have experienced life-or-death situations.

Episodes

External links
 Bio's Celebrity Close Calls official website
 Reelz Celebrity Close Calls official website

2010s American reality television series
2011 American television series debuts
2011 American television series endings